Jin Xiaoyu (born 1972) is a Chinese translator best known for translating the works of the American and Japanese literary into Chinese language. His translations are well respected by domestic and over scholars.

Biography
Jin was born in Tianjin, in 1972, to Jin Xingyong, and Cao Meizao. He has an elder brother named Jin Xiaotian. He has been blind in one eye after an accident and was diagnosed with bipolar disorder at a young age. In 2010, he began translating foreign books into Chinese. Over the past decade, he has translated 22 books from English, Japanese and German and read almost every foreign language novel in Zhejiang Library.

Translations

References

1972 births
Living people
People from Tianjin
Zhejiang University alumni
English–Chinese translators
German–Chinese translators
Japanese–Chinese translators